Napoléon Joseph Louis Bontemps was Governor General for Inde française in the Second French Colonial Empire during the last days of the Second Empire of France and in the initial era of the Third Republic.

Titles Held

French colonial governors and administrators
Governors of French India
People of the French Third Republic
People of the Second French Empire
Year of birth missing
Year of death missing